is a Japanese manga series written and illustrated by Adachitoka. It began serialization in Kodansha's Monthly Shōnen Magazine in December 2010. The series has been collected into twenty-six tankōbon volumes as of February 2023.

A 12-episode anime television series adaptation by Bones aired from January to March 2014. A 13-episode second season, titled Noragami Aragoto, was broadcast from October 2015 to December 2015.

Plot

Hiyori Iki was a normal middle school student until she was involved in a bus accident while trying to protect a stranger. This incident causes her soul to frequently slip out of her body, and she becomes aware of the existence of two parallel worlds: the Near Shore, where regular humans and creatures reside, and the Far Shore, where phantoms (demonic beasts) and human souls linger. Through her soul, she meets the strange, nameless god without a shrine, Yato. Yato is determined to make a name for himself out there by accepting any wish for 5 yen, including Hiyori's to fix her body. Along with Yato's "Regalia" named Yukine – a weapon forged from the spirit of a deceased human's soul – the trio go through many adventures struggling with their friendship, identity, and pasts.

Media

Manga

Noragami is written and illustrated by Adachitoka. The series premiered in Kodansha's Monthly Shōnen Magazine January 2011 issue, released on December 6, 2010, and has been compiled into twenty-six tankōbon volumes between July 15, 2011 and February 16, 2023. The ninth volume was released simultaneously with a limited edition, bundled with a drama CD. Volumes 10 and 11 were released simultaneously with limited editions, each containing an anime episode on DVD. Extra chapters of the series have been published in the spin-off publication, Monthly Shōnen Magazine + since 2011. In November 15, 2013, the first seven chapters were compiled into one volume under the title . Several other chapters were bundled as add-on content to volume 20, released on February 15, 2019.

Both the main series and spin-off series have been licensed in North America by Kodansha USA, under the title Noragami: Stray God and Noragami: Stray Stories respectively. The first volume of Noragami: Stray God was released on September 2, 2014, with twenty-five volumes released as of January 10, 2023. The first volume of Noragami: Stray Stories was released in December 2015. The second volume of Stray Stories, which comes with the special edition of volume 20, has not yet been released in English, and there are currently no announcements of a planned future release.

Anime

The Noragami television series adaptation is produced by Bones and directed by Kotaro Tamura with character designs by Toshihiro Kawamoto. Prior to the series' television premiere, its first episode was screened at 2013's Anime Festival Asia on November 10, 2013. The anime began airing in Japan on January 5, 2014, on Tokyo MX and later on MBS, BS11 and TVA, running for 12 episodes. Besides the television series, two additional episodes were released on DVDs bundled with limited editions of the 10th and 11th manga volumes, published February 17 and July 17, 2014.

Funimation licensed the anime for streaming in North America. Following Sony's acquisition of Crunchyroll, the series was moved to Crunchyroll. Madman Entertainment licensed the anime for distribution in Australia and New Zealand.

A second season, aired for 13 episodes from October 2, 2015 to December 25, 2015.

Game
A mobile game titled Noragami ~Kami to Enishi~ (lit. "Noragami ~Gods and Fate~") was released by developer Sakura Soft for Android devices in October 2015. An iOS release became available on November 16, 2015.

Reception
Noragami was the 14th top selling manga series in Japan during the first half of 2014.

Notes

References

External links
 
 

 

2014 anime television series debuts
2015 anime television series debuts
Action anime and manga
Anime series based on manga
Bones (studio)
Crunchyroll anime
Kodansha manga
Shinto in fiction
Shinto kami in anime and manga
Shōnen manga
Supernatural anime and manga
Tokyo MX original programming
Urban fantasy anime and manga
Yōkai in anime and manga